Castropol is a municipality in Asturias, Spain. It is also the name of a parish within the municipality and a town within the parish.

The municipality of Castropol has a population of 3696 (INE, 2014). It is bounded on the north by the Cantabrian Sea and on the west by a coastal inlet, or ria, which separates it from the municipality of Ribadeo in Galicia, called the river Eo. To the west it is bordered by Tapia de Casariego, by El Franco, Boal and other Asturian municipalities, and to the south by Vegadeo and Villanueva de Oscos.

Castropol is one of the municipalities in which Eonaviego, a Galician-Asturian dialect, is spoken.

Some examples of notable architecture include the 'Capilla del Campo' (15th century), the 'Palacio de Valledor' and 'Palacio de Marqueses de Santa Cruz de Marcenado' (16th-18th centuries, the 'Casa de las Cuatro Torres' (18th century), and the 'Parque de Vicente Loriente' and 'Casino/Casa de Cultura' (early 20th century).

Parishes
It has nine parishes (administrative divisions):
 As Figueiras
 Balmonte
 Barres
 Castropol
 Moldes
 Piñera
 Presno
 Seares
 Tol

References

Municipalities in Asturias